Monkey Warfare is a 2006 Canadian drama film written and directed by Reginald Harkema, starring Don McKellar, Tracy Wright, and Nadia Litz. The film received multiple awards at the Vancouver Film Critics Circle Awards 2006, and received an honorable mention from the Best Canadian Feature Film jury at the 2006 Toronto International Film Festival.

Cast
Don McKellar as Dan
Tracy Wright as Linda
Nadia Litz as Susan
Earl Pastko as Ted
Rob Stefaniuk as real estate agent
Brenda Robbins as figurine lady
Marya Delver as bike girl
Sarah Manninen as bike girl
Rachel Wilson as bike girl
Erin McMurtry as bike girl
Marnie Robinson as bike girl
Jayne Eastwood as garage sales lady
Caroline Gillis as female cop
Lee Rumohr and Melissa Veszi as young couple
Isabel and Jason Knight as husband and wife

Soundtrack
"The Black Poodle" - performed by Comets on Fire
"Nuclear War" - written and performed by Sun Ra
"(Ballad of the) Hip Death Goddess" - written and performed by Ultimate Spinach
"The Old Revolution" - written and performed by Leonard Cohen
"What If We All Stopped Paying Taxes?" - performed by Sharon Jones & The Dap-Kings
"Girls Like That" - performed by Weird War
"Saturday Afternoon" - performed by Outrageous Cherry
"Kill For Peace" and "Group Grope" - performed by The Fugs
"Protest Song '68" - performed by Refused
"Pow! to The People" - performed by The Make-Up
"I (fuck) Mountains" - performed by Pink Mountaintops

Reception
On review aggregator website Rotten Tomatoes, the film has a rating of 75% based on 8 critics, with an average rating of 6.6/10.

References

External links

Films set in Toronto
Canadian drama films
English-language Canadian films
2000s English-language films
2000s Canadian films